Ain Mäesalu (born 23 February 1955 in Emmu-Aruküla) is an Estonian archeologist.

He is teaching archeology at University of Tartu.

His main fields of interest are archeology related to Estonia's medieval castles and city of Tartu, and medieval weaponry.

In 2012, he was awarded with Order of the White Star, IV class.

References

1955 births
Living people
Estonian archaeologists
Recipients of the Order of the White Star, 4th Class
University of Tartu alumni
Academic staff of the University of Tartu
People from Lääneranna Parish